Tridrepana melliflua is a moth in the family Drepanidae. It was described by Warren in 1922. It is found in New Guinea, but probably also occurs in Papua New Guinea.

The wingspan is about 31.8-35.4 mm for males and 35.2-43.8 mm for females.

References

Moths described in 1922
Drepaninae
Moths of New Guinea